Ageplay or age play is a form of roleplaying in which an individual acts or treats another as if they are a different age. Ageplay is roleplaying between adults, and involves consent from all parties. Ageplay is not necessarily sexual. Portraying any age can be the goal of ageplay, from babies to a child to the elderly. Usually this involves someone pretending to be younger than they actually are, but more rarely can involve assuming an older role.

Sexual ageplay 
Ageplay can be sexual. It may be mildly sexual, or very sexual. Within dominant/submissive relationships, ageplay can enhance power dynamics, and allow a partner to feel more comfortable with their dominance or submission.

Sexual variations may include among other things such as incest play, in which individuals recreate and sexualize roles within a family. A common myth is that Caregiver dynamics (Caregiver/little, Daddy/little, Mommy/little) all involve ageplay. However, these dynamics are more about caring for one another than re-enacting an incest fantasy.

Ageplay is not considered pedophilia or related to it by professional psychologists. Individuals who engage in ageplay enjoy portraying children, or enjoy childlike elements typical of children present in adults (and to a lesser extent, adolescents).

Ageplay events 
Specific conventions and major events have formed that specifically cater to ageplayers including:

 CAPCon (2010-Present) a convention that occurs annually at a hotel in the Chicago, Illinois area of the United States
 Camp Abdulia (2012-2018) a gathering that occurred sporadically throughout various cities and states in the United States
 TOMKAT (2013-Present) a gathering that occurs bi-annually at a private wilderness camp in Ontario, Canada
 TeddyCon (2014-2019) a convention that occurred annually at a hotel near Allentown, Pennsylvania in the United States
 West Coast Jungle Gym (2019-2021) a convention that occurred annually at a hotel in San Diego, California area of the United States

See also 
 Age disparity in sexual relationships
 Animal roleplay
 Doll fetish
 Kawaii
 Paraphilic infantilism
 Sexual roleplay

References

External links
 

Sexual roleplay
Sexuality and age